Vermilphalonia is a genus of moths belonging to the subfamily Tortricinae of the family Tortricidae.

Species
Vermilphalonia chytosema Razowski & Becker, 2003

See also
List of Tortricidae genera

References

 , 2003, Polskie Pismo Ent. 72: 153
 , 2005 World Catalogue of Insects, 6

External links
Tortricid.net

Cochylini
Tortricidae genera